Pure Luck is a 1991 American comedy film starring Martin Short and Danny Glover. It is a remake of the popular French comedy film La Chèvre (1981).

Plot
The film opens as the klutzy Valerie Highsmith arrives at an airport in Puerto Vallarta. She calls her father, a wealthy businessman, to let him know that she has arrived. While she is on the phone, she clumsily leans on the railing of her balcony and falls several stories onto a canvas. Soon after, an encounter with some street thieves knocks her unconscious and she loses her memory, then a local criminal named Frank Grimes spirits Valerie away from her hotel.

A psychologist named Monosoff, knowing that Valerie has ultra bad luck, persuades her father to send one of his employees, Eugene Proctor, an accountant with super bad luck, to find her. Perhaps he will be lucky, and his bad luck could help to find the unlucky girl. Eugene is partnered with Raymond Campanella , a hardnosed investigator, who bristles at Eugene's every move.

As they travel to Mexico together, they endure one mishap after another, from damaged luggage and bad hotel rooms to bar fights with strangers. Eventually, they are told by the local police that Valerie was last seen with Frank Grimes. Eugene thinks that he can press a local prostitute for information, but she robs him. Raymond tracks the prostitute down at a gambling club (run by a man named Fernando) and confronts several men at gunpoint to retrieve Eugene's money. Neither of them realizes that Frank Grimes is seated at the table, until after they drive away and look at his picture one more time.

Raymond and Eugene return to the club and abduct Grimes to find out where Valerie is. He confesses that Valerie's extreme clumsiness required him to keep going to hospitals with her, wiping out all his money. He could no longer afford to keep her hostage. So, Grimes turned Valerie over to Fernando (Puebla). Before Grimes can take them to Valerie, he is killed in a drive-by shooting. The police arrest Raymond and Eugene by mistake. After a short stint in jail, they find out that Grimes had put Valerie on a plane to Mexico City which never arrived, and Valerie is presumed dead in a plane crash.

They charter a plane to look for Valerie's wreckage, hoping that she might have survived. During the flight, Eugene is stung by a bee and swells to an enormous size, due to an allergy. As he recovers at a field hospital, he talks to a local man who tells about a strange woman who wandered into their village one day. She was so grateful for being taken in by the villagers that she offered to make them all breakfast in the morning, but she ended up burning the village down by accident. Musing that she might be Valerie, Raymond shows the man her picture, and he screams in terror.

Raymond and Eugene head towards the burned village in search of Valerie. Eugene nearly drives them off a cliff. After barely escaping, Raymond has had enough of Eugene's dreadful luck. In a rage, he reveals to Eugene that the only reason he was hired to find Valerie was because Monosoff thought Eugene's bad luck would somehow combine with Valerie's to create some good luck. Eugene tries to fight Raymond, but he only manages to knock himself out.

Raymond takes Eugene to a local hospital. Realizing that he has befriended Eugene, he asks the nurse to take extra care with him. When Eugene wakes up, he is in a bed next to Valerie, who has also suffered a head wound. They blithely walk off hand in hand. Raymond discovers their empty beds and spots them on the end of a pier. He shouts at Eugene to let him know that he has found Valerie. Eugene stares at her in a daze and asks, "Valerie?" Hearing her name, Valerie recovers her memory. The film ends with the pair floating down the river on a piece of the pier that has broken off and is headed towards a massive waterfall.

Cast
Martin Short as Eugene Proctor
Danny Glover as Raymond Campanella
Sheila Kelley as Valerie Highsmith
Sam Wanamaker as Highsmith
Scott Wilson as Frank Grimes
Harry Shearer as Monosoff
Jorge Russek as Inspector Segura
Rodrigo Puebla as Fernando
John H. Brennan as Tyler
 as Pilot
Abel Woolrich as Prisoner
Patricia Gage as Secretary
Ariane Pellicer as Girl at Club
Alexandra Vicencio as Nurse
Sharlene Martin as Nurse

Reception
In 1998, director Nadia Tass reported she was still receiving residuals from the film because of its success in America.
It was successful in a financial sense but not in a satisfying sense. It was congenial doing a Martin Short comedy, but American comedy is different from Australian comedy. It is broader. American audiences enjoyed Pure Luck, but audiences in other countries did not enjoy it so much with the exception of the Germans. I wanted to do something else with the comedy and so did Danny Glover. I would like to have put a lot more pathos and pain into it. But they wanted a comedy for America.

The cartoon series Hey Arnold! had a character, Eugene Horowitz, who is also a jinx and was likely based on Eugene Proctor from the film. The Simpsons introduced a character named Frank Grimes in "Homer's Enemy" who suffers a similar fate at the hands of the cosmically careless Homer Simpson.

Owen Gleiberman summed up Pure Luck in his D− review as, "a numbingly repetitive farce in which the cursed Short trips, walks into walls, trips, spills an entire saltshaker onto his breakfast, trips, sets people on fire, trips ..." Roger Ebert gave the film one and a half stars, and zeroed in on the emptiness of much of the film's comedy:Consider, for example, the scene where Proctor and Campanella are in a Jeep that is teetering on the edge of a cliff, its rear wheels hanging in mid-air. We've seen situations like this many times before, but I can't remember one less compelling. It unspools without comic timing, it stops dead in the middle, the payoff isn't funny, and later we can see it wasn't even much of a cliff.

Caryn James praised Martin Short's efforts in the film, which she found otherwise forgettable, "Against the odds, he makes Pure Luck always painless and sometimes genuinely amusing. Martin Short can do anything, it seems, except find the right movies to star in."

On review aggregator website Rotten Tomatoes, the film has an approval rating of 15%, based on 13 reviews.

References

External links

1990s adventure comedy films
1990s comedy mystery films
American adventure comedy films
American comedy mystery films
American remakes of French films
Films directed by Nadia Tass
Films set in Mexico
Universal Pictures films
1991 comedy films
Films with screenplays by Timothy Harris (writer)
Films with screenplays by Herschel Weingrod
1990s English-language films
1990s American films
Films based on works by Francis Veber